Old Tom Morris (16 June 1821 – 24 May 1908) designed or remodelled about 75 golf courses throughout his life in the British Isles, including The Open Championship courses of Prestwick, the Old Course at St Andrews, Muirfield, Royal Portrush, and Carnoustie. GolfPass has said that "You could make an argument that Old Tom Morris is the greatest golf course architect who ever lived".

Career

Morris started designing golf courses whilst working at Carnoustie, when he was employed as an apprentice to Allan Robertson. Many of the courses that he subsequently designed have since been remodelled, but not all of them. In 1850, Allan Robertson initially designed the Carnoustie Golf Links, Old Tom Morris remodelled and extended it to a full 18 holes in the early 1870s. Carnoustie's only surviving Morris hole is the par 5 6th hole, previously known as "Long", it was officially renamed on 24 September 2003 as "Hogan’s Alley" by the 1999 Open Championship winner at Carnoustie Paul Lawrie in honour of Ben Hogan's victory at the same course in The Open in 1953.

He also laid out The Himalayas, 9-hole putting course in St Andrews in 1867 for the St Andrews Ladies Golf Club. It lies next to the Old Course, north of the Swilcan Burn. It is thought that it was the first minigolf or 'miniature links' course in the world, and it's now both a 9-hole and 18-hole putting course.

Morris introduced many of the greenskeeping techniques that are still used today, including:

 The standardised the length of a golf course to 18 holes.
 The first to use a lawn mower to cut putting greens.
 He is said to have accidentally discovered the benefits of routinely dressing the tops of greens with sand to improve the density and uniformity of the putting turf, when he accidentally spilled a wheelbarrow full of sand onto a green.
 Using fertilisers, lime, sulfates, and compost to improve the growth of the turf.
 Using drainage and irrigation to improve linksland golf courses, by digging shallow wells at each green for irrigation and with making minor drainage improvements to bunkers.
 The first strategic design of hazards such that hazards could work as markers so that players could plan their play around them. Before his time, hazards, such as bunkers, were left alone. Morris began managing the state of these hazards.
 Yardage markers, which tell golfers how far they are from the green. The markers can indicate that they are for example 200 yards, 150 yards, or 100 yards from the green.
 The first tee boxes, also known as the teeing area. Before his time, golfers would tee off for the next hole from the green they had just played.

Golf courses designed by Old Tom Morris

  Denotes that there is no corroborating evidence to suggest that any other architect was involved in designing the golf course

Open Championship courses designed by Old Tom Morris

See also
List of golf course architects
Tom Morris Golf Shop

Notes

References

Further reading

External links

Old Tom Morris
Morris